Clever Clogs  (subtitled Live in Concert) is a live and video album by 10cc released in 2008.

Overview
The album was recorded and released by the 10cc touring band, led by the only original member Graham Gouldman, a fact highlighted by the sub-credit featuring Graham Gouldman and friends which appears on the album cover, with established 10cc members Rick Fenn and Paul Burgess together with Mick Wilson and Mike Stevens.

The 10cc touring band and the album are notable in featureing not only 10cc material, but also songs from Gouldman's song-writing and musical career, including Wax and GG/06 songs.

Clever Clogs is also features the original 10cc member Kevin Godley who makes a guest appearance and sings two songs. 'The album was produced and the live concert directed by Bafta winner Robin Bextor for New Wave Pictures.

The cover art for the album, with the new band's logo, was designed by long-time 10cc collaborator Storm Thorgerson.

Release and reception
The live and video albums were originally released separately in 2008. The DVD edition included three additional songs not present on the CD version.
In 2014 the album was reissued by Wienerworld Presentation as a separate CD and a CD+DVD pack.

Track listing 
All tracks composed by Graham Gouldman and Eric Stewart, except where indicated:

 "The Wall Street Shuffle"
 "The Things We Do for Love"
 "Good Morning Judge"
 "I'm Mandy Fly Me" (Gouldman, Stewart, Kevin Godley)
 "Life Is a Minestrone" (Stewart, Lol Creme)
 "Art for Art's Sake"
 "Bus Stop" (Gouldman)
 "No Milk Today" (Gouldman)
 "Look Through Any Window" (Gouldman, Charles Silverman) DVD only
 "For Your Love" (Gouldman)
 "Old Wild Men" (Godley, Creme)
 "BeautifulLoser.com" (Gouldman, Godley) DVD only
 "Silly Love" (Stewart, Creme)
 "Donna" (Godley, Creme)
 "The Dean and I" (Godley, Creme)
 "Bridge to Your Heart (Andrew Gold, Gouldman) DVD only
 "I'm Not in Love"
 "Dreadlock Holiday"
 "Ready to Go Home" (Gouldman, Gold)
 "Rubber Bullets" (Gouldman, Creme, Godley)

DVD Bonus Materials 
 Extended conversation with Graham Gouldman about the songs and how they were written
 The Art of 10CC with Storm Thorgerson 
 Kevin Godley on stage with 10cc in Cardiff

Personnel 
 Graham Gouldman – vocals, bass guitar, guitar
 Mick Wilson – vocals, percussion, guitar
 Rick Fenn – vocals, lead guitar, bass guitar
 Paul Burgess – drums, percussion
 Mike Stevens – vocals, keyboards, saxophone, guitar, bass guitar
 Kevin Godley – vocals on "Old Wild Men" and "BeautifulLoser.com", percussion on "Rubber Bullets"
 Jess Bailey – piano on "BeautifulLoser.com"

Charts

Video

References 

10cc albums
2008 live albums
Albums with cover art by Storm Thorgerson